Gav Kosh-e Vosta (also Romanized as Gāv Kosh-e Vosţá, Gav Kosh-e Vasaţī, and Gāv Kosh-e Vosţā; also known as Golābād) is a village in Khaveh-ye Jonubi Rural District, in the Central District of Delfan County, Lorestan Province, Iran. At the 2006 census, its population was 204, in 41 families.

References 

Towns and villages in Delfan County